BBCi can refer to:

BBC Online, the website of the BBC, formerly known as BBCi between 2001 and 2004
BBC Red Button, the BBC digital television text service, known as BBCi between 2001 and 2008
Bombay, Baroda, and Central India Railway (BB&CI), an Indian rail company
Dr. B. Borooah Cancer Institute, Guwahati, India

See also

 Bbc1 (disambiguation)
 
 BBC (disambiguation)